Lézat-sur-Lèze (literally Lézat on Lèze; Languedocien: Lesat) is a commune in the Ariège department in southwestern France.

Geography
The Lèze forms part of the commune's southern border, flows north through the commune, then forms part of its northern border.

Population

Twin town 
Lézat-sur-Lèze is twinned with Ateca in Spain.

See also
Communes of the Ariège department

References

Communes of Ariège (department)
Ariège communes articles needing translation from French Wikipedia